Grigore II Ghica (1695 – 3 September 1752) was Voivode (Prince) of Moldavia at four different intervals — from October 1726 to April 16, 1733, from November 27, 1735 to 14 September 1739, from October 1739 to September 1741 and from May 1747 to April 1748 — and twice Voivode (Prince) of Wallachia: April 16, 1733 – November 27, 1735 and April 1748 to September 3, 1752. He was son of Matei Ghica (son of Grigore I Ghica).

Reigns
He was helped to gain the throne in Iași by previous Prince Nicolae Mavrocordat, upon Mihai Racoviță's deposition by the Ottoman overlord. He decreased taxes, but chose to continue the established policy of awarding offices to Greeks and Levantines instead of local boyars. Thus, he faced mounting opposition from Dimitrie Racoviță, who tried to remove Scarlat by enlisting Budjak Tatars' help – he was however rejected after clashing with Ghica and his Wallachian and Ottoman allies. With the outbreak of the Russo-Turkish War came Imperial Russian occupation, forcing Grigore II Ghica to leave Moldavia briefly, in September–October 1739.

Although he tried to counter Constantin Mavrocordat's intrigue at the Porte, Ghica was deposed and exiled in 1741, gaining the throne for a final, brief time in 1747–1748. He effectively purchased the throne in Bucharest — the exorbitant payment made him rely on further increased taxation.

Legacy
He repaired several monasteries and built the Frumoasa one in Iași, and the one at Pantelimon – the church's patron saint, Panteleimon, is the eponym for both the commune Pantelimon, Ilfov, on the edge of Bucharest, and the Pantelimon Quarter of the capital. Ghica also built and furnished the area's hospital (staffed with Eastern Orthodox monks), the basis for the modern one.

He had two sons Scarlat Ghica and Matei Ghica.

References

Ghica family
Ghica, Grigore II
Ghica, Grigore II
Rulers of Moldavia and Wallachia
18th-century Romanian people
18th-century monarchs in Europe
Romanian people of Albanian descent
Dragomans of the Porte